A patternmaker is a skilled worker who produces patterns on paper or fabric for use in the clothing industry.

Apparel patternmakers draft patterns based on a designer's sketch of a style. The designer gives the sketch to the patternmaker, who can ask questions to determine details the designer is looking for.

Patterns may be drafted on paper or in a computer program designed for patternmaking. Most of the time, in modern American samplerooms, the patternmaker pulls an existing pattern (or block) and makes a modified copy of it to match the new style, either on paper or on computer. If the style is completely new, the patternmaker will usually drape a rough draft in muslin fabric on a dress form, then show it to the designer to discuss any changes before transferring the markings to paper to create the pattern for cutting. Patterns may also be drafted from measurements, this method can also produce well fitting garments as long as the patternmaker has a good handle on shapes and balance. Patternmakers are also asked to copy existing garments without damaging them. This is a common practice in American samplerooms.

Patternmakers have a combination of engineering and design skill. They need to be able to understand what the designer wants, and translate that into the lines of a pattern that will cause the garment to fit correctly. Ideally, the pattern captures not only the fit, but also the flair intended by the designer.

Patternmaking is taught in conjunction with fashion design education, as it is vital for designers to understand the apparel development process. It is also taught as a major at certain trade schools. There are many books on the subject, but it is rare for a patternmaker to become a professional through teaching oneself. Apprenticeships are almost unheard of in modern America, but would serve well to improve the transition from student to professional status. Because this occupation is relatively unknown outside of the apparel industry, there is a serious lack of patternmakers who can accurately interpret designs in Los Angeles, and possibly other fashion capitals.

See also 

 Pattern (sewing)

References

Design
Fashion